Michael Winston Melvill (born November 30, 1940 in Johannesburg, South Africa) is a world-record-breaking pilot  and one of the test pilots for SpaceShipOne, the experimental spaceplane developed by Scaled Composites. Melvill piloted SpaceShipOne on its first flight past the edge of space, flight 15P on June 21, 2004, thus becoming the first commercial astronaut, and the 435th person to go into space. He was also the pilot on SpaceShipOne's flight 16P, the first competitive flight in the Ansari X Prize competition.

Life and career

In 1978, Melvill met aerospace designer and Scaled Composites founder Burt Rutan when he flew to California to show Rutan the VariViggen he had built at his home. Rutan then hired him on the spot. In 1982, he was named Rutan's lead test pilot.

In 1997, Melvill and Dick Rutan, Burt's brother, flew two Long-Eze aircraft that they built side-by-side around the world. This "around the world in 80 nights" flight was called The Spirit of EAA Friendship World Tour, and some legs of it lasted for over 14 hours.

His famous 2004 flights in SpaceshipOne earned him and the entire project team the Ansari X Prize of $10 million and helped spur the beginning of the global private space race.

Later in his career, he became Vice President/General Manager at Scaled Composites.

Mike Melvill holds FAA Commercial certificate, ASEL, AMEL, instrument airplane, rotorcraft-helicopter, glider and now astronaut.

Awards and achievements

As of January, 2020, Melvill is the sole or joint holder of ten FAI aviation world records in various categories.

He was awarded the Iven C. Kincheloe Award in 1999 for high altitude, developmental flight-testing of the model 281 Proteus aircraft.

Through SpaceShipOne flight 15P in 2004, he is known as the first privately funded human spaceflight mission pilot to reach space.

References

External links
 
 
 

1940 births
Living people
People from Johannesburg
South African people of British descent
Commercial astronauts
American aviators
South African astronauts
Scaled Composites
Scaled Composites Tier One program
Glider pilots
Aviation pioneers
Alumni of Hilton College (South Africa)
Alumni of Highbury Preparatory School
American test pilots
People who have flown in suborbital spaceflight